Protestants (including Anglicans) are a very small religious minority in Turkey, comprising less than one tenth of one percent of the population.

Though, there are several significant and major Protestant churches and worship sites in Turkey protected legally, most of them are located in the 4 large cities of Istanbul, Izmir, Ankara and Bursa. 

Considerable ones and significant communities include the Dutch Union Church of Istanbul, German Protestant Church (Istanbul), Armenian Protestant Church (Istanbul) and the All Saints Church in Istanbul.

Violence against Christians
The constitution of Turkey recognizes freedom of religion for individuals. The Armenian Protestants own three Istanbul Churches from the 19th century.

On November 4, 2006, a Protestant place of worship was attacked with six Molotov cocktails. In 2007 three Protestants were killed at a Bible publishing house in Malatya, allegedly by the illegal and split-away gendarmerie unit JİTEM. Turkish pro-AKP (government) and conservative media has criticized Christian missionary activity intensely. 

There is an Alliance of Protestant Churches in Turkey, supporting protection of Protestant rights legally.

Turkish converts
There is an ethnic Turkish Protestant Christian community in Turkey numbering around ~10,000, mostly adherents, and most of them coming from a Muslim Turkish background. In 2003, the Milliyet newspaper claimed that 35,000 Turkish Muslims had converted to Christianity.

A 2015 study estimates about 4,500 Christians are from a previous Muslim background in the country. While other sources estimated the number of the Turkish who converted to Christianity (most of them secret worshippers) between 4,000–6,000, or more than those numbers.

Protestant denominations 
Baptist church
Bulgarian Congregational Church
Evangelical Alliance Church
German Protestant Church
Greek Evangelical Church
Religious Society of Friends
Turkish Protestant Church
Union Church of Istanbul
Union of the Armenian Evangelical Churches in the Near East
Church of England

See also
 Christianity in Turkey
 Religious minorities in Turkey

References 
Source of the list: The World Christian Encyclopedia, Second edition, Volume 1, p. 756

 
Turkey